Modern Comics may refer to:

 Modern Comics, an imprint of Charlton Comics
 Modern Comics, an imprint of Millennium Publications
 Military Comics (later Modern Comics), a comic book published by Quality Comics
 The Modern Age of Comic Books, comics published since the mid-1980s